Dhenkanal is a Vidhan Sabha constituency of Dhenkanal district, Odisha.

This constituency includes Dhenkanal, Gondia block and 20 GPs (Baladiabandha, Baliamba, Beltikiri, Bhaliabolkateni, Bhapur, Chandrasekhar Prasad, Dhirapatana, Gobindpur, Kaimati, Kakudibhag, Kankadahad, Kankadpal, Madhusahupatna, Mangalpur, Manipur, Nadiali, Nagiapasi, Sankarpur, Saptasajya and Talabarkote) of Dhenkanal block.

Vidhan Sabha Members

Fifteen elections held during 1951 to 2014.
Elected members from the Dhenkanal constituency are:

2014: (55): Saroj Kumar Samal (BJD)
2009: (55): Nabin Nanda (NCP)
2004: (118): Sudhir Kumar Samal (Congress)
2000: (118): Krushna Chandra Patra (BJP)
1995: (118): Nabin Chandra Narayandas (Congress)
1990: (118): Tathagata Satpathy (Janata Dal)
1985: (118): Nandini Satpathy (Independent)
1980: (118): Nandini Satpathy (Congress-Urs)
1977: (118): Nandini Satpathy (Janata Party)  
1974: (118): Nandini Satpathy (Congress)
1971: (136): Surendra Mohan Pattanaik (Orissa Jana Congress)
1967: (136): Ratnaprava Devi (Swatantra Party)
1961: (76): Ratnaprava Devi (Ganatantra Parishad)
1957: (52): Kalia Dehuri (Ganatantra Parishad)
1951: (17): Baishnab Charan Patnaik (Communist)

Election Results

2019 Election Result

2014 Election Result
In 2014 election, Biju Janata Dal candidate Saroj Kumar Samal defeated Bharatiya Janata Party candidate Krushna Chandra Patra by a margin of 3,294 votes.

2009 Election Result
In 2009 election, Nationalist Congress Party candidate Nabin Nanda defeated Indian National Congress candidate Sudhir Kumar Samal by a margin of 6,933 votes.

1977 Election Result
 Nandini Satpathy (Janata Party) : 31,829 votes    
 Malati Choudhury (Independent) : 4,063

Notes

References

Assembly constituencies of Odisha
Dhenkanal district